Lolti is a small village in the Tharali tehsil of Chamoli district in Uttarakhand, India.

Demographics
As of the 2011 Census of India, Lolti is a medium size village with total 235 families residing. The Lolti village has population of 1,023 of which 475 are males while 548 are females.

See also
Gwaldam
Kulsari
Badhangarhi temple

References

Villages in Chamoli district